Sidas Cone is a cinder cone on the Big Raven Plateau at the northern end of Mount Edziza Provincial Park in British Columbia, Canada. Its name, meaning "cut oneself with a knife" in the Tahltan language, is descriptive of the breach that has cut the cone into two symmetrical halves.

See also
 Northern Cordilleran Volcanic Province
 Volcanism of Canada
 List of volcanoes in Canada
 List of Northern Cordilleran volcanoes
 Volcanism of Western Canada

References

External links

Mount Edziza volcanic complex
Cinder cones of British Columbia
Holocene volcanoes
Monogenetic volcanoes
One-thousanders of British Columbia